Paul Joseph "Page" Hoeper (born April 16, 1946, in Ann Arbor, Michigan) is a United States consultant who served as United States Assistant Secretary of the Army for Acquisition, Logistics, and Technology from 1998 to 2001.

Biography
Hoeper was educated at Princeton University, receiving a B.S.E. in Basic Engineering in 1968.  He then attended Harvard University and received an M.A.T. in Mathematics in 1972.  Beginning in the mid-1970s, he began working for the United States Department of the Navy as a consultant on major missile and anti-submarine system procurement.  Hoeper later joined the faculty of Stanford Law School and taught as an adjunct professor at the USC Gould School of Law.  He taught a class entitled What Lawyers Should Know About Business from 1991 to 1995.

In 1993, the Defense Science Board named Hoeper as a member of its Task Force on Acquisition Reform, in which capacity he served on the Oversight Cost Panel and the Large-Scale R&D Commercial Practices Panel.  From 1994 to 1996, he was president of Fortune Financial.

In March 1996, Hoeper became Deputy Under Secretary of Defense for International and Commercial Programs, an office he held until May 1998.  At that time, President of the United States Bill Clinton nominated Hoeper to be United States Assistant Secretary of the Army for Acquisition, Logistics, and Technology, and Hoeper subsequently held this office from May 29, 1998, until January 20, 2001.

Hoeper then left government service, and, since February 2001, has worked as a business consultant.  He has served on the board of directors of Versar, Inc. as chairman of the board.

References

1946 births
Living people
People from Ann Arbor, Michigan
Princeton University School of Engineering and Applied Science alumni
Harvard Graduate School of Education alumni
Stanford Law School faculty
University of Southern California faculty
United States Army civilians
21st-century American engineers